Acrocercops sarcocrossa is a moth of the family Gracillariidae. It is known from Fiji.

The larvae feed on Calophyllum species. They probably mine the leaves of their host plant.

References

sarcocrossa
Moths described in 1924
Moths of Oceania